Éric Heulot (born 9 October 1962) is a French former cyclist. He competed in the team time trial at the 1988 Summer Olympics.

References

External links
 

1962 births
Living people
French male cyclists
Olympic cyclists of France
Cyclists at the 1988 Summer Olympics
Cyclists from Rennes